A foundry is a factory that produces metal castings.

Foundry or The Foundry may also refer to:

Manufacturing 
 Type foundry, a type of company that produces and/or distributes typefaces
 Semiconductor fabrication plant, a factory where semiconductor devices are manufactured using the Foundry model

Other 
 The Foundery (or Foundry), an 18th-century Methodist chapel London established by John Wesley
 The Foundry (United States region), the industrial core of North America as identified by Joel Garreau
 The Foundry, a U.S. organization identified as a white nationalist hate group by the Southern Poverty Law Center
 The Foundry Visionmongers, a London-based VFX software company
 The Foundry, East Quay, Peel, Isle of Man, one of Isle of Man's Registered Buildings
 Foundry (bar), a bar in Shoreditch
 Foundry Networks, a U.S. Ethernet switch and router manufacturer
 "The Foundry" (Supernatural), an episode of the television series Supernatural
 Foundry (band), an American hard rock band from Las Vegas
 Wargames Foundry, a games company created by Bryan Ansell
 Foundry, a network of mental health resource centres in British Columbia
 Foundry, a fictional planet in the Star Wars franchise
 Foundry, a wholly-owned subsidiary of International Data Group